Christopher Gill Harman is a British insurance broker and underwriter who is a name at Lloyd's of London.

Harman is a philatelist who was formerly president of the Royal Philatelic Society London. He signed the Roll of Distinguished Philatelists in 2003.

References 

British philatelists
Presidents of the Royal Philatelic Society London
Living people
Year of birth missing (living people)
Signatories to the Roll of Distinguished Philatelists
Insurance underwriters
British businesspeople